Gary G. Cohen is President Emeritus of Cohen Theological Seminary, in Torrance, California, and in Seoul, South Korea. After graduating from Temple University in Philadelphia with a B.S.Ed., he taught high school biology and chemistry at Germantown High School in Philadelphia, and physics at Shelton College in Ringwood, New Jersey. Cohen then graduated from Faith Theological Seminary with an M.Div. and a STM, and received his Th.D. from Grace Theological Seminary in Winona Lake, Indiana. In 1989, a Litt.D. was conferred upon him for his writings, including Hosea-Amos, Understanding Revelation, The Horsemen Are Coming, and Weep Not for Me.  Articles by him appear in Zion's Fire and in other periodicals.

Cohen was one of the translators of the New King James Bible, and he did editorial work on the Red Letter King James Bible and contributed articles for the Christian Life Bible and the Kirban Prophecy Bible. His articles on Hebrew and Greek words appear in the "Old Testament Theological Word Book" and in "The Complete Bible Library."

Cohen is a retired Army Reserve chaplain (COL), and is a graduate of the United States Air Force Air War College. He has also served as pastor of two churches, as president of both Graham Bible College (in Bristol, Tennessee) and Clearwater Christian College, and as a professor at Miami Christian College.

In 1994, with the help of his family, he built the prototype for the model of the old City of Jerusalem, now housed in Orlando, FL, at the Holy Land Experience.

Publications
Biblical Separation Defended (1966) 
Civilization's Last Hurrah (1975)
Understanding Revelation (1978) 
The Horsemen Are Coming (1979)
Weep Not for Me (1980)
Hosea-Amos (1981) co-authored with H Ronald Vandermey 
From Persecution to Service: The Chaplain Gary Cohen Story (2013)

References

External links
https://florida.tiu.edu/academics/faculty/gary-g-cohen-thd-littd-dd/

American educators
American translators
American religious writers
American print editors
Temple University College of Education alumni
Faith Theological Seminary alumni
American biblical scholars
American theologians
Living people
United States Army chaplains
1934 births